The 1999 term of the Supreme Court of the United States began October 4, 1999, and concluded October 1, 2000. The table illustrates which opinion was filed by each justice in each case and which justices joined each opinion.

Table key

1999 term opinions

1999 term membership and statistics
This was the fourteenth term of Chief Justice Rehnquist's tenure, and the sixth consecutive term in which the Court's membership had not changed.

Notes

References

 
 
 
 

Lists of United States Supreme Court opinions by term